José Naranjo Rivera (19 March 192613 December 2012) was a Mexican football forward who played for Mexico in the 1950 and 1954 FIFA World Cups. He also played for CD Oro.

References

External links
FIFA profile

1926 births
2012 deaths
Mexico international footballers
Association football forwards
Footballers from Jalisco
CD Oro footballers
1950 FIFA World Cup players
1954 FIFA World Cup players
Liga MX players
Mexican footballers